Sofia Yuriyivna Andrukhovych (born 17 November 1982) is a Ukrainian writer and translator. The wife of Andriy Bondar, Ukrainian writer.

Life and career 

Sofia Andrukhovych was born in Ivano-Frankivsk, the daughter of Yurii Andrukhovych. She is married to a Ukrainian writer Andriy Bondar, with whom she has a daughter Varvara, born 10 March 2008.

Andrukhovych is a co-editor of Chetver periodical. In 2004 she received a residence grant from Villa Decius Association in Kraków where she used to live. She now resides in Kyiv.

In December 2014, her novel Felix Austria won BBC Ukrainian's Book of the Year 2014 award. An additional publication inspired by the novel's contents, was a recipe book compiled with Marianna Dushar. A Ukrainian-Polish feature film Viddana by director Chrystyna Syvolap was released in 2020.

In March 2021, she received the Women in Arts Award in literature.

Publications

Prose 
 Літо Мілени (Kyiv, 2002).
 Старі люди (Ivano-Frankivsk, 2003).
 Жінки їхніх чоловіків (Ivano-Frankivsk, 2005).
 Сьомга (Kyiv, 2007).
 Фелікс Австрія (Lviv, 2014).
 English translation Felix Austria forthcoming 2023.
 Амадока (Lviv, 2020).

Translations 
 Manuela Gretkowska. Європейка. Translation from Polish.
 J. K. Rowling. Гаррі Поттер і келих вогню. Translation from English (together with Viktor Morozov].

References 

Ukrainian women writers
1982 births
Living people
Ukrainian translators
Writers from Ivano-Frankivsk